Olive Mary "Polly" Marshall (17 May 1932 – March 1995) was an English cricketer who played as a right-handed batter and right-arm medium bowler. She appeared in 13 Test matches for England between 1954 and 1966. She played domestic cricket for Yorkshire.

References

External links
 
 

1932 births
1995 deaths
England women Test cricketers
People from Pickering, North Yorkshire
Sportspeople from Yorkshire
Yorkshire women cricketers